Vila azeca, the azeca banner, is a species of butterfly of the family Nymphalidae. It is found in the Amazonian region from Colombia to Bolivia. The habitat consists of lowland rainforests at altitudes below 800 meters.

Adults have been recorded imbibing mineralised moisture from rocks or riverbeds.

Subspecies
Vila azeca azeca (Bolivia)
Vila azeca mariana (Bates, 1865) (Brazil: Amazonas)
Vila azeca stalachtoides (Bates, 1865) (Brazil: Amazonas)
Vila azeca cacica Staudinger, 1886 (Ecuador)
Vila azeca semistalachtis Hall, 1928 (Colombia)

References

Butterflies described in 1848
Biblidinae
Fauna of Brazil
Nymphalidae of South America
Taxa named by Edward Doubleday